The Google Modular Data Center was a modular data center built from a set of shipping containers, and used by Google to house some of its servers.

The data centers were rumored to cost US$600 million each, and use from 50 to 103 megawatts of electricity.  They housed the computing resources that comprise the Google platform.

History 
Google was reported in November 2005 to be working on their own shipping container datacenter.   Google's patent on the concept was still pushed through the patent system and was successfully issued in October 2007. In 2009 Google announced that their first container based data center has been in production since 2005.

See also 
 Sun Modular Datacenter

References

External links 
 Going Green at Google
 Google Data Center
 

Google real estate
Data centers
Intermodal containers
Modular datacenter